The Sigma 8mm f/3.5 EX DG is a photographic lens introduced on 9 August 2006. It is a circular fisheye lens, designed to project a 180-degree field of view in all directions onto a circular image when used on a full-frame camera.  The lens is available in Canon, Nikon, and Sigma mounts.

External links 
 Sigma 8mm f/3.5 EX DG official page

008mm f/3.5 EX DG
Fisheye lenses